The Investment Analyst's Society of Southern Africa (IAS, IASSA) is the liaison body for the financial analyst profession in South Africa. It is based in Johannesburg South Africa, with members from Cape Town, Durban and throughout the region.

Membership
The IAS currently has 2100 members drawn from all walks of the analyst profession including Investment Banks, Fund Managers, Brokers, Insurance Companies, and Pension funds.

In order to qualify for membership applicants must be employed in the field of financial analysis and must have either a post-graduate business qualification or at least 3 years experience as an investment analyst.

Activities

Company results
The IAS is probably best known for hosting and scheduling listed company results presentations. It also promotes a prestigious annual awards ceremony for "Best Communicating and Reporting" of listed companies. Among the award winners in 2010 was Gold Fields, which received the award for Best Overall Reporting of Mineral Resources and Mineral Reserves. Other award winners included Arcelor Mittal, Nedbank, Sanlam, Group Five, Bidvest, Tongaat Hulett, Digicore, First Rand, Murray & Roberts and Emira Property.

Training
One of the key objectives of the IAS is to promote education in the field of investment analysis. The IAS runs various certificate courses in "Securities Investment Analysis" in conjunction with The Johannesburg School of Finance, as well as corporate specific courses, and training workshops for the CFA, CAIA and FRM.

Investment Analysts Journal
The society publishes Investment Analysts Journal a bi-annual peer reviewed academic journal aimed at investment professionals. The journal is regarded as the premier South African finance journal and receives academic support from the University of Cape Town, Stellenbosch University and the University of Pretoria's Gordon Institute of Business Science.

Status
The IAS is a non-profit making body and was registered in 1969 as an "association not for gain." The IAS is managed by a pro bono board and one full-time Executive Officer. The current chairman is Mr. Mike Brown, and the Chief Executive Officer is Mr. Jamie Yaldwyn.

See also
JSE Securities Exchange
Bond Exchange of South Africa
The South African Futures Exchange
AltX
South African Institute of Stockbrokers
South African Institute of Financial Markets
Companies traded on the JSE
Economic Society of South Africa
Economics Research South Africa
Economic History Society of Southern Africa
CFA Institute
Research report
Financial analyst

External links
Investment Analysts Society of Southern Africa
Investment Analysts Journal (includes full archive)
List of IAS Award Recipients

Footnotes

Analyst societies
Research institutes in South Africa
Investment in South Africa
Business and finance professional associations
Finance in South Africa